Ženski odbojkaški klub Partizan, commonly known as ŽOK Partizan, is the women's volleyball department of Serbian sports club JSD Partizan based in Belgrade. It was established in 1946 and dissolved in 1972, being re-established in 2016. The club won titles in the Yugoslav Volleyball Championship and is currently playing in the Serbian Super League.

History

Yugoslav years
The women's volleyball department was established in 1946 and participated in the Yugoslav Volleyball Championship and Cup. Its most successful period was during the 1950s and 1960s, when it won the Yugoslav Championship on eight occasions and the Yugoslav Cup twice. The women's volleyball department was dissolved in 1972.

Serbian years
In 2013 an agreement with OK Vizura was made and Partizan's name was revived. Under the agreement, Partizan conceded its name, logo and colours to be used by Vizura's structure, creating a team called . In the 2013–14 season, the team won the Super Cup, finished second in the Serbian Cup and won the Serbian Super League. After that one season, the association ended.

During the summer of 2016, the management of the OK Partizan, led by the president of the club, Predrag Golijanin, and at the initiative of the famous volleyball player Željko Tanasković, decided to re-establish the women's team after a 44 years absence. Renewed ŽOK Partizan became administrated by OK Partizan under the organization of JSD Partizan. The women's department has teams in many categories (senior, junior, youth) competing in the 2016–17 season.

Since autumn 2016, OK Partizan founded a volleyball school for girls of all ages. The school is led by coaches that have extensive experience working with all selections. The club won its first season in the regional league, securing promotion to the national second league (Prva Liga), however the club was awarded promotion straight to the first league (Superliga) for the 2017–18 season.

The club plays its home matches at the Master Sports Center, with capacity for 1,350 spectators, located in Zemun (a suburb of Belgrade).

Honours

National competitions
  Yugoslav Volleyball Championship: 8
1952, 1955, 1956, 1957, 1958, 1960, 1961, 1968

  Serbian Volleyball Championship: `
2014

  Yugoslav Volleyball Cup: 2
1959, 1960

  Serbian Super Cup: 1
2013

Team
Season 2017–2018, as of December 2017.

Notable former players

  Gordana Tkačuk
  Branka Jaramazović
  Danica Glumac
  Štefanija Milošev
  Nataša Luković
  Desanka Končar
  Milica Stojadinović (1956–1971)
  Rajka Grozdanović
  Vida Nikolić - Popović
  Mirjana Nikolić
  Mirjana Despotović
  Ljubica Žakula
  Mirjana Rajačić
  Pavlina Tolić

Former coaches
  Ljubomir Aćimović

See also
ŽOK Vizura

References

External links
 Official website  
 Profile at srbijasport.net 

Partizan
Volleyball clubs established in 1946
1946 establishments in Yugoslavia
2016 establishments in Serbia
Volleyball